Mohajeran (also Romanized as Mohājerān and Mahājerān; also known as Mārān-ī-Muhājran and Muhājīrān) is a city in Lalejin District, in Bahar County, Hamadan Province, Iran. At the 2006 census, its population was 7,756, in 1,697 families.

References

Populated places in Bahar County
Cities in Hamadan Province